Ethecon Foundation is a German environmental organisation, which describes itself as a "foundation for ethics and economy". Founded in 2004, Ethecon started presenting annual awards, the Blue Planet Award which is given for actions deemed to be protecting the environment, and conversely the Black Planet Award given to those deemed to be destroying it, in 2006. The foundation has initiated campaigns against Monsanto, Nestlé, Blackwater and TEPCO and has contributed to the construction of a self-governing children's hospital in Fukushima, which commenced operation in 2013.

Blue Planet Award recipients
2006 – Diane Wilson, environmental activist
2007 – Vandana Shiva, environmental activist
2008 – Hugo Chávez, President of Venezuela
2009 – Uri Avnery, Israeli peace activist
2010 – Elias Bierdel, human-rights activist
2011 – Angela Davis, political activist
2012 – Jean Ziegler, human-rights activist
2013 – Esther Béjarano, Holocaust survivor
2014/15 – Tomo Križnar, Slovenian peace activist
2016 – Huberto Juárez Núnez, Mexican social activist
2017 – Hanna Poddig, german environmental activist
2018 – Ann Wright, US peace activist
2019 – Rachna Dhingra, Indian human rights activist

Black Planet Award recipients
2006 – Monsanto
2007 – Peter Brabeck-Letmathe, Chairman of Nestle, and Nestle shareholder Liliane Bettencourt were chosen by the Ethecon Foundation because in their opinion Nestle had engaged in "irresponsible marketing of baby-food, genetic engineering and the monopolizing of water."
2008 – Xe Services. The award was delivered in person to Erik Prince, CEO of Xe Services at the time.
2009 – Formosa Plastics Group and its CEO, Lee Chih-tsuen. Former Blue Planet winner Diane Wilson travelled to Taiwan to deliver the award in person.
2010 - BP for the Deepwater Horizon oil spill
2011 – Tokyo Electric Power Company for the Fukushima Daiichi nuclear disaster
2012 – Glencore Xstrata along with Ivan Glasenberg (CEO), Simon Murray (Chairman) and Tony Hayward (committee for environment, health and safety)
2013 – (the CEO and major shareholders of) Deutsche Bank
2014/15 – CEOs Andrew Liveris and James Ringler and major shareholders of Dow Chemical Company
2016 – CEOs Muhtar Kent and James Quincey and major shareholders of The Coca-Cola Company, Warren Buffett and Herbert Allen Jr.
2017 – CEOs Armin Papperger and Ulrich Grillo and major shareholders of Rheinmetall, Larry Fink (Black Rock) and Paul Manduca
2018 – CEOs Herbert Diess and Hans Dieter Pötsch and major shareholders of Volkswagen, Wolfgang Porsche and Stephan Weil
2019 – CEO and company founder José Batista Sobrinho as well as major shareholders of worlds biggest meat processing company JBS S.A., Wesley Mendonça Batista and Joesley Mendonça Batista

See also

 List of environmental awards

References

External links
Official website

International environmental organizations
Environmental organisations based in Germany
Organisations based in Düsseldorf
Non-profit organisations based in North Rhine-Westphalia
Organizations established in 2004
2004 establishments in Germany